The Second season of You Can Dance – Po prostu Tańcz. The dancers compete to win PLN 100,000, and a 3-month scholarship in dance school Broadway Dance Center but first they have to go through auditions later 36 contestants do the workshops abroad country – this season Buenos Aires – Argentine, to get to the top 16 featured in the live show. In this season special guest choreographer was Marty Kudelka. From sixteen people, two dancers are eliminated in each episode (In Semi-Final episode there was one contestant eliminated), to the final episode that features the top three contestants. The show is hosted by Kinga Rusin. The judges are Agustin Egurrola, Michał Piróg and Weronika Marczuk-Pazura. It premiered on March 5, 2008. Artur Cieciórski was announced as the winner June 5, 2007

Changes from Previous season
 In final choreography round with Guest Star Choreographer were participating only dancers in danger. The dancers which were picked to top 16 previously, might risked they place in finals and participate in the class.
 Dancers weren't coupled for 3 first live shows. After every single episode new couples were drawn.

Auditions
Season Background Song: Destination Calabria – Alex Gaudino/Mission: Impossible theme

Open auditions for this season were held in the following locations:
 Bytom
 Kraków
 Gdańsk
 Warszawa

The song during sneak peeks at the end of the episode is Just Lose It – Eminem

Top 36 dancers
During the auditions judges picked 36 dancers. These dancers were taking part in choreography camp in Buenos Aires, Argentina.

These dancers were shown only in youcandance.tvn.pl website extras.
These dancers weren't shown anywhere.
These dancers earned the tickets after choreography round.

Returning Dancers
This season there were some returning dancers, who were trying their chances last seasons.

Choreography Camp (Buenos Aires) week 
Judges: Agustin Egurrola, Weronika Marczuk-Pazura, Michał Piróg

Top 16 Contestants

Women

Men

Elimination chart

Performance nights

Week 1: Top 16 Showcase (April 9, 2008)

Group Performance: Ramalama (Bang, Bang) — Róisín Murphy
Musical Guest: Pinnawela – You Can Dance

Top 16's solos:

# After Voting these dancers will be safe in next week

Week 2: Top 16 (April 16, 2008)

Group Performance: So Much Better—Janet Jackson/Let Me Think About It – Ida Corr

Bottom 3 Couples solos:

Eliminated:
Katarzyna Kordzińska
Filip Wala
New partners:
None. New partners are randomly assigned each week
# Kamil "Santi" Węsierski did not perform due to injury, in next episode he has to perform his solo in bottom. He was substituted by choreographer's assistant – Szasza Latuszkin

Week 3: Top 12 (April 30, 2008)

Group Performance: Beat It—Michael Jackson ft. Fergie

Bottom 3 Couples solos:

Eliminated:
Roksana Saniuk
Kamil "Santi" Węsierski

Week 4: Top 12 (May 7, 2008)

Guest Judge: Iza Miko
Group Performance: Numb/Encore—Linkin Park & Jay-Z

Bottom 3 Couples solos:

Eliminated:
Katarzyna "Milla" Kordzińska
Łukasz Słaniewski

Week 5: Top 10 (May 14, 2008)

Group Performance: Jump Around—House of Pain/Good Vibrations – Marky Mark
Musical Guest: Jak Anioła Głos – Feel (With Top 10)

Bottom 3 Couples solos:

Eliminated*:
Żaneta Majcher
Patryk Rożniecki

Week 6: Top 8 (May 21, 2008)

Group Performance: Free Your Mind— En Vogue
Couple dances:

Bottom 3 Couples solos:

Eliminated:
Aneta Gąsiewicz
Kamil Guzy

Week 7: Top 6 (May 28, 2008)

Group Performance: The Anthem— Pitbull ft. Lil Jon
Couple dances:

Top 6's solos:

Eliminated:
Justyna Białowąs
Gieorgij Puchalski

Week 8: Semi-Finale – Top 4 (May 28, 2008)

On this episode weren't Group Performance

Top 4's solos:

Eliminated:
Anna Radomska

Week 9: Finale – Top 3 (June 5, 2008)

Group Performance: Rhythm of the Night – Valery (Top 16)
Special Performance: You Can Dance – Pinnawela (Top 3)
Guest Performance: Good Luck – Basement Jaxx (Top 16 and first season winner Maciej Florek)

Top 10 Performances of season:

Top 3's solos:

Results:
Winner: Artur Cieciórski
Runner Up: Katarzyna Kubalska
3rd Place: Kryspin Hermański

First for any So You Think You Can Dance series
 First live show in season was the first ever live episode without elimination. The dancers performed only solos and 4 group dances.

First for You Can Dance - Po Prostu Tańcz!
 First episode was for the first time showdown episode.
 From this season 36 dancers went on choreography camp instead of season's 1 50.
 First ever ballet routine performed by couple.

Rating Figures

External links
So You Think You Can Dance Poland Official Website

Season 02